HCPT or Hosanna House and Children's Pilgrimage Trust is a United Kingdom based charity which travels with disabled and disadvantaged children and adults on pilgrimage to the Sanctuary of Our Lady of Lourdes, in Lourdes, France. HCPT stands for Hosanna House and Children's Pilgrimage Trust, Hosanna House being the property the organisation owns in the hills above Lourdes. It was founded in 1956 by Michael Strode.

History
HCPT is a charity which was formed in 1956 when Dr. Michael Strode first took four children with disabilities on a pilgrimage holiday to Lourdes, establishing a new approach to pilgrimage for children with disabilities.

From HCPT grew the Hosanna House Trust, which was the response to a request from young adults for an opportunity to experience a similar holiday to that of the children. Today, Hosanna House, the Trust's residential centre just outside Lourdes in Bartrès, takes nearly 2,000 pilgrims in groups of 40 to 50, many of whom have disabilities or special needs. These guests stay for a week between Easter and November.

In 1996, HCPT celebrated the 40th Anniversary of the Pilgrimage Trust. Here, the whole Pilgrimage, of around 5000 people, congregate in St Bernadette's Basilica for the Trust Mass, the culmination of which is the singing of the song 'Rise and Shine', the unofficial HCPT Anthem.

In 1998 HCPT and the Hosanna House Trust were combined as "HCPT - The Pilgrimage Trust".

Pilgrimages today
HCPT takes around 1,000 children from the UK on its annual Easter pilgrimage - with groups from Ireland, Belgium, Croatia, Bosnia and Herzegovina, Poland, Romania, Slovakia, Spain, USA and West Indies joining it too. The total size of the Easter Pilgrimage is around 5000, which includes all helpers, nurses, doctors and chaplains.

A further 1,500 people stay at Hosanna House each year, in groups of up to 50. These groups welcome people of all ages.

HCPT also owns a villa in Bartrès, near Hosanna House. This is a self-catering house for up to 15 people which is accessible and available to all throughout the year.

Activities
HCPT's pilgrimages are centred on the international Shrine of Our Lady of Lourdes and gives people of all ages and abilities the opportunity to experience a thoroughly enjoyable group holiday. All are welcome to join the pilgrimage whatever their faith is, or if they have none.

Fundraising
HCPT relies entirely on donations from the public and fundraising by its 250+ groups throughout the UK.

In 1999, Donnie Munro,  former lead singer of the band Runrig, released a record in aid of HCPT which received the support of Frances Shand Kydd, the mother of Diana, Princess of Wales.

References

External links
 HCPT's website
 Irish Pilgrimage Trust's website
 DUH's website

Children's charities based in the United Kingdom
Health charities in the United Kingdom
Catholic Church in England and Wales
Christian pilgrimages
Charities based in Warwickshire